Mimochariergus is a genus of beetles in the family Cerambycidae, containing the following species:

 Mimochariergus carbonelli Zajciw, 1960
 Mimochariergus fluminensis Napp & Mermudes, 1999

References

Compsocerini